Primeval and Other Times is a fragmentary novel by Olga Tokarczuk, published by Wydawnictwo W.A.B. in 1996.

It is Tokarczuk's third novel and was highly successful. It is set in the fictitious village of Prawiek (Primeval) at the very heart of Poland, which is populated by some eccentric, archetypical characters. The novel chronicles the lives of Prawiek's inhabitants over a period of eight decades, beginning in 1914. It has been translated into many languages (published in English in Antonia Lloyd-Jones' translation by Twisted Spoon Press in 2009) and established Tokarczuk's international reputation as one of the most important representatives of Polish literature in her generation.

Structure
The novel is divided into 60 short vignettes, each focusing on different fictional characters in different periods of time. According to Tokarczuk, this fragmentary form of storytelling, which she further explored in House of Day, House of Night (1998), is representative of the novel's perception of reality. According to the author, the style of writing arouses this fragmentary perception and conveys that the separate vignettes are part of something greater. Tokarczuk was not fully conscious of the structure's purpose when she wrote the novel, but she strongly defended it against the publisher who suggested changing it.

The novel contains elements of fantasy mixed with magic realism.

Setting
In developing the setting for the novel, Olga Tokarczuk modeled after the village of Zagrody, located in the Kielce region, where she spent her childhood holidays. Tokarczuk emphasized, however, that although it owes its topography to that of Zagrody, Prawiek is a fictional village of her own creation. Tokarczuk has rejected linking characters presented in the book with the real inhabitants of Zagrody. The attempts by journalists to do so in the 1990s she considered outrageous. In 2012, inhabitants of Staszów County organized a project to document the locations presented in the novel through photography.

Reception
After its publication, the novel was reviewed by many Polish critics.  wrote that "Olga's time" in literature had come, describing her prose as one of the most captivating phenomena in literature and compared it to the writings of Bolesław Leśmian and Bruno Schulz.  criticized Tokarczuk's prose as being conformist and having a quality more typical of the entertainment industry. Wojciech Browarny considered there to be a feminist element in Tokarczuk's writing, but said she should not be categorised into the group of feminist writers.  praised Tokarczuk for being representative of the prose of young women.

The novel was nominated for the 1997 Nike Award jury prize. It was, however, awarded their audience award for 1997. Tokarczuk was also awarded the 1996 Paszport Polityki in the literature category. She was also awarded the Kościelski Award in 1997. The novel was a success with readers in Poland and abroad, and has been translated into over twenty languages. In 2010, it was published in English as Primeval and Other Times by Twisted Spoon Press, translated by Antonia Lloyd-Jones. The novel was included in the official reading list of Poland's Ministry of National Education.

Adaptations
 play Prawiek i inne czasy Białostockiego Towarzystwa Wierszalin, dir. , premiered 1997

Publication history

References

Polish novels
1996 novels
20th-century Polish novels
Novels by Olga Tokarczuk
Novels set in Poland
Polish novels adapted into plays
1996 in Poland
Postmodern novels
Magic realism novels
Nike Award-winning works